Treat Huey and Max Mirnyi were the defending champions, but lost in the first round to Oliver Marach and Fabrice Martin.

Jamie Murray and Bruno Soares won the title, defeating John Isner and Feliciano López in the final, 6–3, 6–3.

Seeds

Draw

Draw

Qualifying

Seeds

Qualifiers
  Radu Albot /  Mischa Zverev

Lucky losers
  Marcelo Arévalo /  Luis Patiño

Qualifying draw

References
 Main draw
 Qualifying draw

2017 Abierto Mexicano Telcel